Willis Leonard Burton Reeve (29 April 1905 – 6 September 2001) was an Australian rules footballer who played with Fitzroy in the Victorian Football League (VFL).

The eldest son of British Army Sergeant Leonard Reeve (1866–1955) and Grace Marie Reeve, nee Weston (1881–1948), Willis Reeve was born in what was then Burma on 29 April 1905. The Reeve family migrated to Australia in 1911.

Reeve later served in the Royal Australian Air Force during World War II.

Notes

External links 

1905 births
2001 deaths
 VFL/AFL players born outside Australia
Australian rules footballers from Victoria (Australia)
Fitzroy Football Club players
Burmese emigrants to Australia
Royal Australian Air Force personnel of World War II
Sportspeople from Mandalay